George C. Miller   (1853–1929) was an American professional baseball player who played catcher during the 1877 and 1884 baseball seasons.

External links

Baseball players from Kentucky
Cincinnati Reds (1876–1879) players
Cincinnati Red Stockings (AA) players
19th-century baseball players
1853 births
1929 deaths
Major League Baseball catchers
Springfield Champion City players
Portland (minor league baseball) players
Macon (minor league baseball) players
Mobile Swamp Angels players
People from Newport, Kentucky